The Carro Armato M Celere Sahariano (Italian for "Saharian Fast Medium Tank") or Fiat M16/43 was a prototype medium tank developed by the Kingdom of Italy during World War II to match the speed and firepower of contemporary British cruiser tanks encountered by Italian forces during the Western Desert Campaign. The project was cancelled following the expulsion of Axis forces from North Africa in May 1943. Had it entered service, the tank's designation would likely have been M16/43: "M" for Medio, "16" representing the vehicle's weight in metric tons and "43" being the planned year of introduction.

Development
In early 1941, the Italian Army requested that Fiat and Ansaldo develop a low profile  tank to counter the faster A-13 series tanks exemplified by the Crusader tank. Fiat-Ansaldo began the new tank project in June 1941 by creating a wooden mock-up on a M14/41 medium tank chassis, inclining the tank's armour plates to create a glacis. The armour remained, like other contemporary Italian tanks of the period, bolted rather than welded together and generally thinner than tanks of other countries. Many different engines, including petrol-fueled aircraft engines, were tested on the chassis before development of the Sahariano tank was halted. At the time of cancellation a 275 hp gasoline engine was being tested. An elongated M14/41 turret housing a 47 mm 47/40 L40 was tested on the Sahariano tank and would also be used by the M15/42 medium tank. There were plans to later fit a 75 mm gun on the production model of the Sahariano tank as well. The Sahariano was the first Italian tank to feature a torsion bar suspension system a more robust and faster suspension system than the leaf spring bogies used on previous Italian tank designs. Ansaldo based the Sahariano's suspension on British tanks encountered in North Africa and a captured Soviet BT-5 from the Spanish Civil War. By the time of the project's cancellation, the design looked very similar to their British counterparts but with a notably lower design profile, making the tank easier to conceal and more difficult to hit.

Several factors contributed to the project's demise: the concurrent development of the Carro Armato P 40 heavy tank; the strain of introducing a new tank model on an already weakened Italian industrial base; the potential of license production of foreign tanks such as the Czechoslovakian T-21 medium tank; and, most decisively, Italy's loss of its Libya colony and the seeming end of a need for a fast tank.

Notes

References

External links
 Italian Experimental Tanks

Medium tanks of Italy
World War II tanks of Italy
Fiat armored vehicles
Gio. Ansaldo & C. armored vehicles
World War II medium tanks